Yulin Township is a township under the administration of Linxia County, Gansu, China. , it has 8 villages under its administration.

References 

Township-level divisions of Gansu
Linxia County